Prem Akkaraju is the founder of Weta Cloud – which sold to Unity Software on November 9, 2021, for $1.625 billion – and CEO of Wētā FX (formerly named Weta Digital).

Wētā FX is a VFX and animation studio with over 1,500 staff and six Academy Awards, ten Academy Sci-Tech Awards and six visual effects BAFTA Awards. Some of Weta Digital's most notable works include Lord of the Rings, Avatar, Avatar sequels, The Hobbit, Avengers: Infinity Wars, Avengers: End Game, Game of Thrones, Space Force, Mulan and King Kong.

Executive producer
Akkaraju was an executive producer of the 2021 Oscar-nominated feature film The White Tiger. The film is based on the 2008 Man Booker Award-winning book of the same title. Other executive producers of the film include Priyanka Chopra, Ava DuVernay, Ramin Bahrani and Mukul Deora. The White Tiger released on Netflix worldwide on January 22, 2021.

Career
In June 2020, Akkaraju announced Wētā FX will also be producing original content under a newly-formed entity called Weta Animated. Peter Jackson and Fran Walsh will be developing and directing original animated content for the venture. Akkaraju oversees all of Wētā FX, including Weta Animated.

Akkaraju and Sean Parker co-founded The Screening Room. The Screening Room, a proposed movie delivery service, includes shareholders Steven Spielberg, Ron Howard, J.J. Abrams, Martin Scorsese and Peter Jackson. Akkaraju also served as the CEO of The Screening Room and now serves as executive chairman.

Akkaraju was included in Varietys inaugural Silicon Valleywood Impact Report, in which he was described as a "technology maven". He is an inventor of 26 technology patents in secure-content delivery.

Personal life
Akkaraju has an MBA from Columbia Business school and lives in Los Angeles with his wife Mary Ann and two children.

References

1972 births
Living people
People from Los Angeles
Indian chief executives
Columbia Business School alumni
Silicon Valley people
Technology company founders
Businesspeople in software
21st-century American businesspeople
21st-century Indian businesspeople
American people of Indian descent